Georgis Kostoprav (in Soviet spelling , ,  9 November 1903 – 14 February 1938) was a Rumeika poet, playwright and journalist, who wrote in Mariupol Greek.

Life
Georgis Kostoprav was born in the village 
(then Maly Yanisol') into a family of a scrivener. After two years elementary school in his village he went to Mariupol Realschule.

From 1926 to 1927 Kostoprav served in the Red Army. In 1927 he worked in Illich Steel and Iron Works as a secretary in the personnel department. In 1932 Kostoprav started to work in Mariupol Greek (Rumeika) newspaper  as an executive editor and journalist. In 1933 he published his first book of poems and in 1934 became a member of the Union of Soviet writers. Actively participating in editing, publishing, conferences, Kostoprav was regarded as a leader of the Greek writers' group. The review of 1937 claims him "the biggest Soviet Greek writer".

In 1936 he married Olga Maslakova.

In the night 23/24 December 1937 Kostoprav was arrested in course of so-called Greek operation. 14 February he was sentenced to death and shot the same day. His widow was informed that he died of sarcoma 23 July 1944 (this date was later repeated in his biographies, until the documents on his sentence and execution were published). He was officially rehabilitated in 1957.

Writing
Kostoprav published in 1920s his first poems written in Russian in Mariupol newspapers Il'ichovets, Golos truda, Priazovskii proletarii. In 1930s he published his poems and short stories in Rumeika Greek in local almanacs and magazines Flogomitres Spithes, Neos Machitis, Pioneros and in the newspaper Kolechtivistis.

In 1933 was published Kostoprav's debut book of poems The first steps, including his poetry and translations from Russian and Ukrainian poets. In 1934 he published a poem Leontis Chonagbeis  about a Rumeika folk poet of 19 century .

He also translated for this theatre multiple plays from Russian.

During his short career Kostoprav also contributed to translations from Russian, including two books of Chekhov's stories, poems of Alexander Pushkin and Agniya Barto's poetry for kids. Non-less essential are his translations into Mariupol Greek from Ukrainian poets, Maksym Rylsky, Volodymyr Sosiura and Taras Shevchenko, in particular he translated Shevchenko's Testament.

He also translated into Russian, among others, a poem of Rumeika poet  Pirnos and some samples of Rumeika folklore.

Publications
 Ta prota vimata (Τα πρώτα βήματα, "The first steps"). Preface by F. Yali in Greek and in Russian. Mariupol, 1933.
 Leontis Chonagbeis (Λεοντής Χονάγμπεης, "Leontis Chonagbeis"). Mariupol, 1934.
 Kalimera, zisimo (Καλημέρα, ζήσιμο! "Hello, life!"). Stalino, 1937. - 96 p.
 G. A. Kostoprav: sochineniia (Г. А. Костоправ: сочинения, "G. A. Kostoprav: works"). Eds. G. A. Animitsa and  M. P. Galikbarova. Mariupol, 2012. The book includes Russian, Ukrainian and Rumeika writings of Kostoprav.

Translations
In 1930s Russian translations of Kostoprav's poems regularly emerged in literary magazines.
 G. Kostoprav. Dva mitinga (Два митинга, "Two meetings"), an authorised translation by A. Faber. Literaturnyi Donbass, 1934, no. 4–5, p. 116-118.
 G. Kostoprav. Groza (Гроза, "Thunder"), an authorised translation by P. Shadura. Literaturnyi Donbass, 1936, no. 3, p. 73.

Posthumously under the same title Hello, life were published two books of translations into Russian and Ukrainian:
 Kalimera, zisimo! (Калимера, зисимо!). Poems in Russian translations /Ed. B. Ya. Shadur, preface by E. Voloshko. Donetsk: "Knizhnoe izdatelstvo", 1963. - 194 p. (2nd ed. 1989., 126 p.)
 Kalimera, zisimo! (Калімера, зісімо!). Poems in Ukrainian translations. /Ed. Olga Kostoprav. Dnipropetrovs'k: "Dnipro", 1969. - 143 p.

Commemoration
 In 1994 in the village Maloyanisol, where Kostoprav was born, was erected his monument and opened a museum. Also in poet's name is named one of the streets in the village.
 In November 2003, on anniversary of Kostoprav's birth, a commemorative plaque was placed in Mariupol on the building, where once has been located the editorial of the Rumeika Greek newspaper Kolechtivistis (Miru avenue, 35). Judging by recent footage from the place, the plaque did not survive the Russian siege of Mariupol in 2022.

References

1903 births
1938 deaths
People from Mariupol
People from Donetsk Oblast
Greek male poets
20th-century Greek poets
Greek prisoners sentenced to death
Executed Greek people
Greek people executed by the Soviet Union
Ukrainian Greeks
Greek diaspora in Ukraine
Great Purge victims from Ukraine
Persecution of Greeks in the Soviet Union
Soviet rehabilitations
Varieties of Modern Greek
Languages of Ukraine